Tilloy-lès-Hermaville is a commune in the Pas-de-Calais department in the Hauts-de-France region of France.

Geography

Population

Places of interest
 The church of St.Martin, with the tower dating from the sixteenth century.
 The Carondelet manor house.

See also
Communes of the Pas-de-Calais department

References

Tilloyleshermaville